For the martyr of 447 in Bet-Titta, see Simon of Bet-Titta.

Mana of Bet-Parsaje was a Christian martyr under Shapur II, in November, 339. Mana was tortured and martyred being flayed at Bet-Nikator.

Companion martyrs
Mana was martyred alongside two of his companions, 
Abraham of Bet-Parsajje. He was blinded by red-hot nails and martyred at Bet-Nikator
Simon of Bet-Parsaje. He was shot by arrows and martyred at Bet-Nikator

There is no reference to their ever having had a feast day in known literature.

References
Holweck, F. G. A Biographical Dictionary of the Saints. St. Louis, MO: B. Herder Book Co. 1924.

Year of birth missing
339 deaths
Groups of Christian martyrs of the Roman era 
Persian saints
4th-century Christian martyrs
Christians in the Sasanian Empire